Thirteen Stars is a power pop alternative rock band from Oklahoma City, OK. The current roster includes Scott Starns (vocals, guitar), Jason Deal (guitar), Annatomik (bass) and Mike Mosteller (drums, samples).

Band history
The core of Thirteen Stars was formed in 1998 when singer Scott Starns and former guitarist Anthony DeWolfe met bassist Annatomik and drummer John London through an ad in a local Oklahoma City newspaper. The band immediately started doing local gigs and gathered a solid fanbase.

In 1999, after only a few months together, the band self-financed their first album titled The Nova Project, which was produced by Trent Bell. Soon after the band had graduated to bigger gigs and tours in the southwest and midwest region, opening for acts such as The All-American Rejects, Blue October and Maroon 5.

In 2002 the band released a collection of demos titled Songs from the Musicbox and continued regionally touring. In 2005 the band released These Places, their first national release.

Members
Current Members
Scott Starns
Jason Deal
Annatomik
Mike Mosteller

Past Members
John London
Anthony DeWolfe
Sean Miller

Discography
The Nova Project (1999)
Songs from the Musicbox (2002)
These Places (2005)

External links
 Thirteen Stars Official Site
 Thirteen Stars on Myspace
 Review of "These Places"

American power pop groups
Musical groups from Oklahoma
Alternative rock groups from Oklahoma
Musical groups from Oklahoma City